Tore Antonsen (born 9 March 1950) is a Norwegian footballer. He played in eight matches for the Norway national football team from 1972 to 1981.

References

External links
 
 

1950 births
Living people
Norwegian footballers
Norway international footballers
Association football goalkeepers
Hamarkameratene players